The following is a list of notable daggers, either historical or modern. A dagger is a knife with a sharp point designed for fighting.

Ancient daggers
Acinaces
Bronze Age dagger
Parazonium
Pugio
Sica

European tradition
High Middle Ages
Knightly dagger
Late Middle Ages
Anelace (14th century long English dagger, worn as an accoutrement)
Baselard (14th century long cutting dagger)
Bollock dagger, rondel dagger, ear dagger (thrust oriented, by hilt shape)
Poignard
Renaissance
Cinquedea (broad short sword)
Misericorde (weapon)
Stiletto (16th century but could be around the 14th)
Modern
Dirk (Scotland)
Hunting dagger (18th-century Germany)
Parrying dagger (17th- to 18th-century rapier fencing)
Sgian-dubh (Scotland)
Trench knife (WWI)
Fairbairn–Sykes fighting knife (British Armed Forces, WW2)
 Puñal (Spain, Latin America)
 Push dagger

Asian tradition

African tradition
Jile
Billao (Somali)
Seme

American tradition
Military issue or commercial designs, 1918 to present.
BC-41 (WWII)
Cuchillo De Paracaidista (Argentine Paratroopers)
Arkansas toothpick (19th-century US)
Facón (Argentina, Brazil, Uruguay)
Corvo (19th-century Chile)
Gerber Mark II (1967)
Push dagger
United States Marine Raider stiletto (WWII)
V-42 stiletto (WWII)
"Yank" Levy fighting knife

See also
Types of swords

External links

Blade weapons

Lists of weapons